Visitors to Guatemala must obtain a visa from one of the Guatemalan diplomatic missions unless they come from one of the visa exempt countries.

Visa policy map

Visa exemption 
Holders of passports of the following 86 jurisdictions can visit Guatemala without a visa for up to 90 days:

ID - May also enter with an ID card if coming from a country that is part of the CA-4 Agreement.

Visa is not required for a maximum stay of 90 days within 180 days for valid visa holders or residents of Canada, the European Union member states, or the United States. This does not apply to nationals of Afghanistan, Albania, Algeria, Angola, Armenia, Bangladesh, Bosnia and Herzegovina, Botswana, Cameroon,  China, Republic of the Congo, Democratic Republic of the Congo, Eritrea, Ethiopia, Ghana, Hong Kong, Indonesia, Iran, Iraq, Laos, Lebanon, Liberia, Libya, Macau, Mali, Mongolia, Mozambique, Nepal, Nigeria, North Korea, Oman, Palestine, Sierra Leone, Somalia, Sri Lanka, Sudan, Syria, Timor-Leste, Venezuela, Vietnam and Yemen, as well as holders of normal passports of Cuba, Haiti, Jordan, Kenya and Pakistan. Visas issued to nationals of these countries are subject to restrictions and additional processing in Guatemala.

Additionally, visa is not required for holders of residence permits issued by El Salvador, Honduras, Nicaragua; or U.S. Green Cards with a U.S. Re-entry Permit (I-571), regardless of nationality.

Transit without a visa is allowed for travellers who normally require a visa but are transiting on the same calendar day and hold onward tickets.

Holders of diplomatic, official or service passports of Belarus, Bolivia, Burkina Faso, Cuba, Dominica, Dominican Republic, Ecuador, Egypt, Grenada, Guyana, Haiti, India, Jamaica, Jordan, Kenya, Montenegro, Morocco, Pakistan, Papua New Guinea, Philippines, Serbia, Suriname and Thailand do not require a visa.

Central America-4 Border Control Agreement 
The Central America-4 Border Control Agreement is a treaty between Guatemala, El Salvador, Honduras and Nicaragua. A visa issued by one of the four countries is honored by all four of the countries. The time period for the visa, however, applies to the total time spent in any of the four countries without leaving the CA-4 area.

See also

Central America-4 Border Control Agreement
Visa requirements for Guatemalan citizens

References

Guatemala
Foreign relations of Guatemala